Peru took part in the inaugural FIFA World Cup in 1930 and enjoyed victories in the 1938 Bolivarian Games and the 1939 Copa América, with goalkeeper Juan Valdivieso and forwards Teodoro Fernández and Alejandro Villanueva playing important roles. 
 
Peruvian football's successful period in the 1970s brought it worldwide recognition; the team then included the formidable forward partnership of Hugo Sotil and Teófilo Cubillas, and defender Héctor Chumpitaz. This team qualified for three World Cups and won the Copa América in 1975.
 
Teófilo Cubillas was selected as Peru's greatest ever player in an IFFHS poll, in which he was also included in the world's Top 50. He is one of only two players to have scored five goals in two different FIFA World Cups.

List of Peru international footballers

The following is a list of football players that have been part of the Peru national football team since the team was officially created in 1927, with more than 50 caps.

Names in bold are players still active to be called-up.
Caps and goals updated as of 13 June 2022.

See also
List of Peru national football team managers
Peruvian Football Federation

References

External links
 Peruvian Football Federation

 
Peru
Association football player non-biographical articles